Solegnathus is a genus of pipehorse native to the Indian and Pacific Oceans.

Species
There are currently five recognized species in this genus:
 Solegnathus dunckeri Whitley, 1927 (Duncker's pipehorse)
 Solegnathus hardwickii (J. E. Gray, 1830) (Hardwicke's pipefish)
 Solegnathus lettiensis Bleeker, 1860 (Günther's pipehorse)
 Solegnathus robustus McCulloch, 1911 (Robust pipehorse)
 Solegnathus spinosissimus (Günther, 1870) (Spiny pipehorse)

References 

 
Syngnathidae
Marine fish genera
Taxa named by William John Swainson